VietJet Air Flight 356 (VJ356/VJC356), a regular domestic flight from Tan Son Nhat International Airport to Buon Ma Thuot Airport, encountered a problem after landing and was running on the runway. All 207 passengers and crew were safe, 6 passengers were injured. The incident occurred at 23:03 on November 29, 2018. The next day, November 30, the company announced this problem. According to the Civil Aviation Authority of Vietnam, the two front wheels of the plane were lost during the landing process, and the plane stopped safely at Buon Ma Thuot airport.

VietJet Air's flight number VJ356 with registration VN-A653 received 2 weeks ago and only operated 8 routes on November 29, encountered a problem in Buon Ma Thuot. Mr. Nguyen Chanh Duy, Director of Buon Ma Thuot Airport, said that Buon Ma Thuot airport had to close and suspend flights to this airport after the incident with VietJet Air.

References 

Aviation accidents and incidents in 2018
Aviation accidents and incidents in Vietnam
May 2018 events
Accidents and incidents involving the Airbus A321
2018 in Vietnam
May 2018 events in Asia
Buon Ma Thuot